Synthesiomyia is a small genus of true flies of the family Muscidae.

Species
Synthesiomyia nudiseta (Wulp, 1883)

References

Muscidae
Brachycera genera
Taxa named by Friedrich Moritz Brauer
Taxa named by Julius von Bergenstamm